Thuruppugulan is a 2006 Indian Malayalam-language action comedy film directed by Johny Antony and written by the Udayakrishna/Siby K. Thomas duo. The film stars Mammootty in the title role, alongside an ensemble cast of Sneha, Innocent, Devan, Kalasala Babu, Suresh Krishna, Jagathy Sreekumar, Raj Kapoor, Vijayaraghavan, Salim Kumar, Harisree Ashokan, Cochin Haneefa, Baburaj and Janardanan in major supporting roles. The music was composed by Alex Paul.

The film follows Kunjumon, a Calicut-based restaurant owner, who is known by his nickname 'Gulan' due to his gambling skills. The film was released on April 14, 2006 and coincided with the 'Vishu' festival.

Plot
The film opens with a kind-hearted street-rowdy who manages his problem and promises to help his stepsister arrives.

Mr. Menon, a millionaire business tycoon, invests in real estate. He entrusts one of his lieutenants, Sreedharan Unnithan, to construct a 5-star hotel in Kochi. He buys a small plot adjacent to a 5-star hotel and gives it to Kochuthoma, Kunjumon's father, to construct a small restaurant. Menon leaves for Singapore and Kunjumon is sent to Calicut by his father, who fears that his son's life might be in danger after Kunjumon badly injured a gangster who try to kill Menon.

Twenty years later, Unnithan fails in forcing Kochuthoma to vacate the site since the restaurant is damaging the reputation of the hotel. Unnithan uses a rowdy named Tipper Vasu to make Kochuthoma sign a contract to vacate, but Kunjumon arrives and fights with Vasu. Kunjumon defeats Vasu in the fight. Unnithan then uses Circle Inspecor Aarumugam to remove Kochuthoma. But, Unnithan arrives and uses his money and power to jail Kunjumon and Kochuthoma.

Meanwhile, Menon decides to return to his native land to see his daughter Lakshmi getting married. But Unnithan and his sons have him framed and imprisoned with the help of Unnithan's son Santosh's friend and international criminal Gavan Joseph. Lakshmi  travels to Kerala to help her father. After events, she meets up with the hero Gulaan Kunjumon (this part takes place before Kunjumon and his father were jailed), the hero of the Calicut Market. Both of them go to Kochi.

To avenge his imprisonment, Kunjumon leases the bar in the 5-star hotel through Kunjumon's relative Swamy, a drunkard gold merchant, and spoils the hotel's reputation. With many twists and turns and a lot of misunderstanding, it becomes clear to Lakshmi that Kunjumon, aka Gulan, is the son of Kochuthoma and Kunjumon finally realizes that Lakshmi is the daughter of Menon, not Unnithan.

Kunjumon and Lakshmi struggle to release Menon and imprison Unnithan and his cruel sons. Finally, Menon is released from prison and returns to Kerala. This time, Kochuthoma tries to block an agreement regarding Unnithan as the future head of the hotel. Kunjumon, along with Menon and Swamy, rushes to the hotel to fight. The movie ends with Kunjumon tearing up the contract...

Cast

Soundtrack
The movie has three songs composed by Alex Paul.

Release
The film was released on 14 April 2006.

Critical reception
India Glitz criticized several aspects of the film, claiming that "even though the basic plot seems to be promising, the film has lost the tempo in the second half cluttered to become a star show." The review concluded that "the highlight of the film is the brisk pace by which the director Johny Antony passes through the events without lending time to think about the other loopy crass. The film is sure to hold masses for its wholesome entertainment, even though in weaker terms."

Box office
The film was one of  the highest grossing Malayalam movie of 2006. The film was commercial success.

References

External links
 
 

2000s Malayalam-language films
Indian action comedy films
Films shot in Kochi
Films shot in Singapore
Films directed by Johny Antony